Eddie Garfinkle is an American football coach.  He served as the head football coach at Birmingham–Southern College in Birmingham, Alabama from 2008 to 2016. He previously served as a defensive coordinator at both Jacksonville State University and Georgia Southern University, assistant coach at Spain Park High School and defensive coordinator at Birmingham–Southern College. Garfinkle was hired as Birmingham Southern's sixth head coach on February 20, 2008. On October 24, 2016, it was announced that Garfinkle would not return after the 2016 season. Garfinkle served as the Gulf Shores High School defensive coordinator from 2018 to 2020.

Head coaching record

References

External links
 Birmingham–Southern profile

Year of birth missing (living people)
Living people
American football linebackers
Birmingham–Southern Panthers football coaches
Georgia Southern Eagles football coaches
Jacksonville State Gamecocks football coaches
Jacksonville State Gamecocks football players
High school football coaches in Alabama